Rainbow is a 2005 Chinese film written and directed by Gao Xiaosong, starring Chen Daoming.

Cast
Chen Daoming as Xu
Li Xiaolu as Rainbow
Ding Yongdai as Sheng
Zheng Jun as Yang

External links

Rainbow on the Chinese Movie Database (listed under the title Fly My Heart)
Rainbow on Sina.com

2005 films
2000s Mandarin-language films
2005 drama films
Films set in the 1930s
Chinese drama films